Roodyards railway station served Roodyards Road in Dundee, Scotland from 1839 to 1840 on the Dundee and Arbroath Railway.

History 
The station opened on 9 June 1839 by the Dundee and Arbroath Railway. It was situated at the south end of Roodyards Road and was the southern terminus of the line until 9 April 1840.

References

External links 

Disused railway stations in Dundee
Railway stations in Great Britain opened in 1839
Railway stations in Great Britain closed in 1840
1839 establishments in Scotland
1840 disestablishments in Scotland
Former Dundee and Arbroath Railway stations